Cabery is a village located in Ford and Kankakee counties in the U.S. state of Illinois.  The population was 266 at the 2010 census.

History
Cabery was founded about 1878 and was named after John R. Caberry, a Chicago merchant.

Geography

The county line between Kankakee County and Ford County runs right through the middle of town on Main Street.

Demographics

As of the census of 2000, there were 263 people, 99 households, and 70 families residing in the village. The racial makeup of the village was 97.34% White, 1.90% from other races, and 0.76% from two or more races. Hispanic or Latino of any race were 2.28% of the population.

There were 99 households, out of which 34.3% had children under the age of 18 living with them, 57.6% were married couples living together, 8.1% had a female householder with no husband present, and 28.3% were non-families. 23.2% of all households were made up of individuals, and 13.1% had someone living alone who was 65 years of age or older.  The average household size was 2.66 and the average family size was 3.13.

In the village, the population was spread out, with 29.3% under the age of 18, 5.7% from 18 to 24, 30.8% from 25 to 44, 19.8% from 45 to 64, and 14.4% who were 65 years of age or older.  The median age was 35 years. For every 100 females, there were 89.2 males.  For every 100 females age 18 and over, there were 87.9 males.

The median income for a household in the village was $37,000, and the median income for a family was $39,375. Males had a median income of $36,719 versus $21,250 for females. The per capita income for the village was $14,839.  About 7.8% of families and 11.6% of the population were below the poverty line, including 17.1% of those under the age of eighteen and 13.8% of those 65 or over.

Commerce

Commerce in Cabery includes a post office, a small hardware store, the Cabery Bar and Grill restaurant, and the Cabery Fertilizer Company. There is also a grain elevator located on the Kankakee County side of Cabery.

Recreation
Cabery has a park with basketball courts, a playground, and a lighted softball field with a press box.

There is also a small pond called "the Clay Hole," which, although unsuitable for swimming, is a popular fishing pond during the warm months. Both bluegills and  small Largemouth bass can be caught there.

References

Villages in Illinois
Villages in Kankakee County, Illinois
Villages in Ford County, Illinois
Populated places established in 1878